Mathematical Sciences Publishers is a nonprofit publishing company run by and for mathematicians.
It publishes several journals and the book series Geometry & Topology Monographs.  It is run from a central office in the Department of Mathematics at the University of California, Berkeley.

Journals owned and published 

 Algebra & Number Theory
 Algebraic & Geometric Topology
 Analysis & PDE
 Annals of K-Theory
 Communications in Applied Mathematics and Computational Science
 Geometry & Topology
 Innovations in Incidence Geometry—Algebraic, Topological and Combinatorial
 Involve, a Journal of Mathematics
 Journal of Algebraic Statistics
 Journal of Mechanics of Materials and Structures
 Journal of Software for Algebra and Geometry
 Mathematics and Mechanics of Complex Systems
 Moscow Journal of Combinatorics and Number Theory
 Pacific Journal of Mathematics
 Probability and Mathematical Physics
 Pure and Applied Analysis
 Tunisian Journal of Mathematics

Journals distributed 
 Annals of Mathematics

Book series
Open Book Series
Geometry & Topology Monographs

References 

Non-profit academic publishers